Cem Pamiroğlu (born 17 September 1957 in İstanbul) is Turkish former footballer who played as a left-back, most notably for Fenerbahçe.

He started his career in Fenerbahçe PAF then up to Fenerbahçe in 1975. He won three Turkish League titles and two Turkish Cup with Fenerbahçe. He also played 23 times for Turkey, six times for Turkey U21 and 14 times for Turkey U18.

He capped 508 times for Fenerbahçe and been fourth most capped (after Müjdat Yetkiner, Lefter Küçükandonyadis and Şeref Has). He was initially loaned to Sarıyer in 1986 and finally transferred to Sarıyer in 1987 and played for her two seasons before his retirement in 1989.

Now he is manager of Turkey U18 and Turkey U19 national football teams. He also managed Çaykur Rizespor, Şekerspor and Göztepe.

References

Living people
1957 births
Turkish footballers
Association football fullbacks
Fenerbahçe S.K. footballers
Sarıyer S.K. footballers
Turkey international footballers
Turkey under-21 international footballers
Turkey youth international footballers